The first season of the American television series MacGyver, consisting of 22 episodes, began on September 29, 1985, and ended on May 7, 1986, and aired on the ABC network. The region 1 DVD was released on January 25, 2005.

Summary
In this season, the show introduces MacGyver, described as "an action hero who practiced non-violent methods and fought with his mind instead of his hands or weapons." It follows MacGyver and his friend Pete, as they use tools and cleverness to deal with difficult and often dangerous situations.

Episodes

See also
Leiningen Versus the Ants (book that inspired "Trumbo's World")

References

External links 
 
 

1985 American television seasons
1986 American television seasons
MacGyver (1985 TV series) seasons